Chris Wideman (born January 7, 1990) is an American professional ice hockey defenseman who is currently playing for the Montreal Canadiens of the National Hockey League (NHL). He was selected in the fourth round, 100th overall by the Ottawa Senators in the 2009 NHL Entry Draft. In addition to the Senators, Wideman briefly played for the Edmonton Oilers and Florida Panthers.

Playing career

Amateur
Wideman was born in St. Louis, Missouri. As a youth, he played in the 2003 Quebec International Pee-Wee Hockey Tournament with the St. Louis Jr. Blues minor ice hockey team.

Wideman played high school hockey for Chaminade College Preparatory School. In 2007, Wideman joined the Cedar Rapids RoughRiders of the USHL where he played one year of Tier I junior hockey before entering Miami University in 2008. After one season at Miami, Wideman was drafted in the fourth round, 100th overall by the Ottawa Senators in the 2009 NHL Entry Draft. During his four-year stint in Miami, he helped the RedHawks earn their first two Frozen Four appearances, a national championship game appearance, and their first CCHA tournament title.

Professional

Ottawa Senators
On March 28, 2012, the Senators signed Wideman to a two-year, entry-level contract. After graduating from Miami, he joined the Senators' American Hockey League (AHL) affiliate, the Binghamton Senators for the 2012–13 season. In his first professional season, Wideman scored two goals and 18 points in 60 games. He also skated in five games for the Elmira Jackals of the ECHL.

Wideman played another two full seasons with Binghamton, and had a career-year during the 2014–15 season. After recording 19 goals and 61 points in 75 games, he was awarded the Eddie Shore Award as the league's best defenseman. On June 29, 2015, the Senators re-signed Wideman to a one-year, two-way contract worth $600,000.

He made his NHL debut on October 17, 2015 against the Nashville Predators. On November 7, in his fourth game, Wideman scored his first NHL goal in a 3-2 loss to the Carolina Hurricanes.

During the 2017–18 season, Wideman underwent surgery to repair a hamstring injury, ending his season. Despite this, Wideman signed a one-year contract extension with the Senators on June 24, 2018.

Uber incident
During the 2018–19 season, on November 4, 2018, a video was released showing Wideman and six of his teammates criticizing the Ottawa Senators and mocking assistant coach Marty Raymond while riding in the back of an Uber vehicle in Phoenix, Arizona. The video had been recorded on October 29, 2018, without the players' knowledge, with Wideman and his then-teammate Matt Duchene talking the most in the video. The video was released by the Uber driver, who was apparently upset by the players' tip and behavior. Wideman, along with the other players involved, later issued a statement apologizing for the incident.

Edmonton Oilers, Florida Panthers and Pittsburgh Penguins
After the Uber incident, Wideman was traded three times in four months. On November 22, 2018, Wideman was traded by the Senators to the Edmonton Oilers in exchange for a 2020 conditional sixth-round pick. Over the course of a month with the Oilers, Wideman featured in only 5 games for 2 assists before he was dealt for a second time within the season, leaving the Oilers along with a 2019 third-round pick, to the Florida Panthers in exchange for Alex Petrovic on December 30, 2018. Wideman made his Panthers debut in a 4-3 overtime defeat to the Columbus Blue Jackets on January 5, 2019, before he was placed on waivers the following day. He cleared waivers and was assigned to AHL affiliate, the Springfield Thunderbirds, where he collected 3 goals and 13 points through 16 games from the blueline.

At the trade deadline, Wideman's journeyman season continued as he was dealt for the third time, traded by the Panthers to the Pittsburgh Penguins in exchange for Jean-Sébastien Dea on February 25, 2019. He was assigned to report directly to AHL affiliate, the Wilkes-Barre/Scranton Penguins.

Anaheim Ducks
As a free agent from the Penguins, Wideman was signed to a one-year, two-way contract with the Anaheim Ducks on July 16, 2019. He did not feature for the Ducks during the 2019-20 season, assigned to AHL affiliate the San Diego Gulls, posting 31 points through 53 games before the remainder of the season was cancelled due to the COVID-19 pandemic.

Torpedo Nizhny Novgorod 
As an impending free agent from the Ducks, Wideman opted to pursue a career in Russia, agreeing to a one-year contract with Torpedo Nizhny Novgorod of the KHL, on June 1, 2020. During the 2020–21 KHL season, he was named KHL Top Defenceman of the Year.

Montreal Canadiens
Following his success in the KHL, Wideman returned to the NHL for the 2021–22 season after signing a one-year, $750,000 contract with the Montreal Canadiens. In 64 appearances with the team that season, he scored 4 goals and 23 assists for a career-best 27 point NHL season. He tied Jeff Petry for the most points by a Canadiens defenceman for the year. He assumed a key role helping to run the team's power play. Following the end of the season, the Canadiens re-signed Wideman to a two-year, $1.525 million contract. Wideman had used the jersey number 20 for his first season with the Canadiens, but he agree to cede the number to the team's 2022 first overall draft pick Juraj Slafkovský in exchange for an autographed jersey as a keepsake for his newborn son.

Career statistics

Regular season and playoffs

International

Awards and honors

References

External links
 

1990 births
Living people
American men's ice hockey defensemen
Binghamton Senators players
Cedar Rapids RoughRiders players
Chaminade College Preparatory School (Missouri) alumni
Edmonton Oilers players
Elmira Jackals (ECHL) players
Florida Panthers players
Ice hockey people from St. Louis
Miami RedHawks men's ice hockey players
Montreal Canadiens players
Ottawa Senators draft picks
Ottawa Senators players
San Diego Gulls (AHL) players
Springfield Thunderbirds players
Torpedo Nizhny Novgorod players
Wilkes-Barre/Scranton Penguins players